MHC class I polypeptide-related sequence B (MICB) is a protein that  is encoded by the MICB gene located within MHC locus. MICB is related to MHC class I and has similar domain structure, which is made up of external α1α2α3 domain, transmembrane segment and C-terminal cytoplasmic tail. MICB is a stress-induced ligand for NKG2D receptor. The heat shock stress pathway is involved in the regulation of MICB expression as transcription of MICB is regulated by promoter heat shock element.

See also 
MICA

References

Further reading